Tataouine Radio is a public local radio created on November 7, 1993. It broadcasts from Tataouine city targeting locals of South East Tunisia.

Content 
The radio broadcasts 18 hours a day with generic content targeting mainly the audiences of South East Tunisia with diverse programming.

Broadcast

FM
Available only in South East Tunisia. The frequencies vary from region to region. Sometimes the service is available in different frequencies.
 92.2 MHz
 89.5 MHz
 102.6 MHz
 87.6 MHz
 96.6 MHz

Internet
Radio is also broadcast online through the official website of the station.

External links
Tunisia Radio website

Radio stations in Tunisia